Héctor Vergara (born December 15, 1966) is a Canadian soccer referee. Although born in San Javier, Chile, Vergara grew up in Winnipeg, Manitoba, Canada.  He attended John Taylor Collegiate. Vergara earned a Bachelor of Recreation Studies (Sports Administration) and a Bachelor of Arts in Advanced Psychology from the University of Manitoba.

Vergara played soccer competitively for 10 years and recreationally for 30 years. He began working as a referee in 1983 and now has 28 years of experience as a referee. In 1993, he officiated matches in the Canadian National Soccer League. As executive director of the Manitoba Soccer Association, Vergara oversees the MSA's many member leagues, clubs and associations, not to mention the countless players, coaches, volunteers, and referees throughout Manitoba.  Since he was hired, the MSA's core staff has grown from two or three employees to seven, mirroring soccer's rise in popularity in the province and the world.  Vergara has become one of the most prolific – and well-respected – referees in Canada.

Vergara retired as a FIFA Assistant Referee effective November 12, 2011, the day after his last FIFA international appointment. He was part of the full Canadian crew alongside Mauricio Navarro (Referee), Daniel Belleau (AR2) and David Gantar (4th) that took take charge of the FIFA World Cup Qualifying match between the US Virgin Islands and Curaçao on November 11, 2011 in Frederiksted, US Virgin Islands.

Vergara spent 19 years on the FIFA list and was involved in 11 FIFA competitions. Three of those competitions were FIFA World Cups (2002, 2006 and 2010). Vergara claimed the record for most World Cup games as a referee/assistant referee at 14 when he took the field July 10, 2010 in the third-place play-off match between Uruguay and Germany at Port Elizabeth Stadium. His amazing World Cup appointments included two 3rd placed matches (2002 & 2010) as well as the Germany - Italy Semi-Final in 2006.

In total, Vergara officiated nearly 150 international matches involving Clubs and Nationals Teams playing at the highest competitions in the world. His list of accomplishments include Six CONCACAF Gold Cups (three Finals), the 2004 Olympic Games (Semi-Final), the 2009 FIFA Confederations Cup (Fifth official on final), two FIFA Club World Cups (finals in 2005 & 2009) as well as two FIFA U-20 World Youth Championship (ARG-FRA QF) and two FIFA U17 World Championships (BRA-ARG semi in 1995, 3rd place match in 1993).

In 2012, Vergara was appointed by FIFA to its Referees' Committee as a Development Member. He was selected as a member of the Canadian Soccer Hall of Fame in 2014.

Career statistics

International Tournaments and Competitions Refereed

2011 CONCACAF Gold Cup
2010 FIFA World Cup South Africa
2010 FIFA World Cup Qualification Matches
2010 CONCACAF Champions League
2010 Interliga
2010 UAE Games
2009 FIFA Club World Cup
2009 FIFA Confederations Cup
2009 CONCACAF Gold Cup
2007 U20 FIFA World Youth Championship
2007 CONCACAF Gold Cup
2006 FIFA World Cup Germany
2006 FIFA World Cup Qualification Matches
2005 FIFA Club World Cup Japan 2005
2005 CONCACAF Gold Cup
2004 FIFA Athens Olympic Games
2004 FIFA Athens Olympic Qualifying Tournament - Mexico
2004 FIFA Toyota U-23 International Tournament - Qatar
2003 CONCACAF Gold Cup - Mexico
2002 FIFA World Cup Korea/Japan
2002 FIFA World Cup Korea/Japan Qualification Matches
2002 CONCACAF Gold Cup
2001 FIFA U-20 World Youth Championship
2000 Olympic CONCACAF Qualifying Tournament
1999 CONCACAF Club Championship
1999 US Cup
1999 Canada Cup
1998 FIFA World Cup France Qualification Matches
1998 CONCACAF U-20 World Championship Qualification Tournament
1998 CONCACAF Caribbean Shell Cup
1997 US Cup
1995 FIFA U-17 World Championship
1995 Canada Cup
1993 FIFA U-17 World Championship

Other information

2010 Sport Manitoba Official of the Year
2006 Sport Manitoba Official of the Year
2005 Sport Manitoba Official of the Year
2004 Sport Manitoba Official of the Year
2004 Included in the book of "Who is Who in Canadian Sport"
2003 John Meachin Memorial Soccer Award
2002 Sport Manitoba Official of the Year
2002 CSA International Achievement Award
2002 MSA Frank Major Award of Merit
1997 MSRA Outstanding Contribution Award
1996 CSA Ray Morgan Memorial Award
1995 WYSA Recognition Award

References

External links
 / Canada Soccer Hall of Fame

1966 births
Living people
People from Linares Province
Chilean emigrants to Canada
Naturalized citizens of Canada
Canadian soccer referees
Canada Soccer Hall of Fame inductees
University of Manitoba alumni
2002 FIFA World Cup referees
2006 FIFA World Cup referees
2010 FIFA World Cup referees